Yang Chenyu (born 8 June 1999) is a Chinese footballer currently playing as a defender for Hebei China Fortune.

Career statistics

Club

Notes

References

1999 births
Living people
Chinese footballers
Chinese expatriate footballers
Association football defenders
Chinese Super League players
Hebei F.C. players
FK Radnički Pirot players
Chinese expatriate sportspeople in Serbia
Expatriate footballers in Serbia